Colectomy (col- + -ectomy) is bowel resection of the large bowel (colon). It consists of the surgical removal of any extent of the colon, usually segmental resection (partial colectomy). In extreme cases where the entire large intestine is removed, it is called total colectomy, and proctocolectomy (procto- + colectomy) denotes that the rectum is included.

Indications
Some of the most common indications for colectomy are:
 Colon cancer
 Diverticulitis and diverticular disease of the large intestine
 Trauma
 Inflammatory bowel disease such as ulcerative colitis or Crohn's disease.  Colectomy neither cures nor eliminates Crohn's disease, instead only removing part of the entire diseased large intestine. A colectomy is considered a "cure" for ulcerative colitis because the disease attacks only the large intestine and therefore will not be able to flare up again if the entire large intestine (cecum, ascending colon, transverse colon, descending colon and sigmoid colon) and rectum are removed. However, it does not always take away extra-intestinal symptoms.
 Bowel infarction, which may be a complication of ischemic colitis
 Typhlitis
 Hirschsprung's disease
 Prophylactic colectomy can be indicated in some forms of polyposis, Lynch syndrome and certain cases of inflammatory bowel disease because of high risk for development of colorectal cancer.

Basic principles
Traditionally, colectomy is performed via an abdominal incision (laparotomy), though minimally invasive colectomy, by means of laparoscopy, is growing both in scope of indications and popularity, and is a well-established procedure  in many medical centers. Recent experience has shown the feasibility of single port access colectomy.

Resection of any part of the colon entails mobilization and ligation of the corresponding blood vessels. Lymphadenectomy is usually performed through excision of the fatty tissue adjacent to these vessels (mesocolon), in operations for colon cancer.

When the resection is complete, the surgeon has the option of immediately restoring the bowel, by stitching or stapling together both the cut ends (primary anastomosis), or creating a colostomy. Several factors are taken into account, including:
 Circumstances of the operation (elective vs emergency); In many cases, emergency resection of colon with anastomosis needs to be done and this carries a higher complication rate since proper bowel preparation is not possible in emergency situations
 Disease being treated; (i.e., no colectomy surgery can cure Crohn's disease, because the disease usually recurs at the site where the healthy sections of the large intestine were joined. For example, if a patient with Crohn's disease has a transverse colectomy, their Crohn's will usually reappear at the resection site of the ascending and descending colons.)
 Acute physiological state of the patient;
 Impact of living with a colostomy, albeit temporarily;
 Use of a specific preoperative regimen of low residue diet and laxatives (so-called "bowel prep").

An anastomosis carries the risk of dehiscence (breakdown of the stitches), which can lead to contamination of the peritoneal cavity, peritonitis, sepsis and death. A number of factors may increase the risk of anastomotic dehiscence, either partial ('leak') or complete. Basic surgical principles include ensuring a good blood supply to the opposing ends, and a lack of tension at the join. The use of NSAIDS for analgesia following gastrointestinal surgery remains controversial, given mixed evidence of an increased risk of leakage from any bowel anastomosis created. This risk may vary according to the class of NSAID prescribed.

Colostomy is always safer, but places a societal, psychological and physical burden on the patient. The choice is by no means an easy one and is rife with controversy, being a frequent topic of heated debate among surgeons all over the world.

Types
 Right hemicolectomy and left hemicolectomy refer to the resection of the ascending colon (right) and the descending colon (left), respectively. When part of the transverse colon is also resected, it may be referred to as an extended hemicolectomy.
 Transverse colectomy is also possible, though uncommon.
 Sigmoidectomy is a resection of the sigmoid colon, sometimes including part or all of the rectum (proctosigmoidectomy). When a sigmoidectomy is followed by terminal colostomy and closure of the rectal stump, it is called a Hartmann operation; this is usually done out of impossibility to perform a "double-barrel" or Mikulicz colostomy, which is preferred because it makes "takedown" (reoperation to restore normal intestinal continuity by means of an anastomosis) considerably easier.
 When the entire colon is removed, this is called a total colectomy, also known as Lane's Operation. If the rectum is also removed, it is a total proctocolectomy.
 Subtotal colectomy is resection of part of the colon or a resection of all of the colon without complete resection of the colon.

Laparoscopic surgery
As of 2012, more than 40% of colon resections in United States are performed via laparoscopic approach.

To begin laparoscopic surgery for a colectomy typically 4 ports are placed in the abdomen to gain access to the peritoneal cavity. The next step is to mobilize the portion of the bowel that is to be resected. This is done by ligation of the mesentery and other peritoneal attachments. A stapler is used to resect the bowel and an anastomosis between the remaining bowel is created.

History
Sir William Arbuthnot-Lane was one of the early proponents of the usefulness of total colectomies, although his overuse of the procedure called the wisdom of the surgery into question.

See also 
 List of surgeries by type

References

External links
 Lotti M. Anatomy in relation to left colectomy
 

Large intestine
Surgical oncology
Surgical removal procedures
Digestive system surgery